al-Malikiyah District is a district of al-Hasakah Governorate in eastern Rojava, Syria. The administrative centre is the city of al-Malikiyah.

al-Malikiyah is both the northernmost and easternmost district in Syria. At the 2004 census, it had a population of 191,994.

Subdistricts
The district of al-Malikiyah is divided into three subdistricts or nawāḥī (population as of 2004):

References

 
Districts of Al-Hasakah Governorate